Elections to the Uttar Pradesh Legislative Assembly were held in February 1974 to elect members of the 424 constituencies in Uttar Pradesh, India. The Indian National Congress, won a majority of seats and Hemwati Nandan Bahuguna was appointed the Chief Minister of Uttar Pradesh.

Result

Elected members

See also
List of constituencies of the Uttar Pradesh Legislative Assembly
1974 elections in India

References

Uttar Pradesh
State Assembly elections in Uttar Pradesh
1970s in Uttar Pradesh